Pazhugal is a panchayat town in Kanniyakumari district in the Indian state of Tamil Nadu.kannumamoodu a Major Trade Centre of Palukal Town.

Demographics
 India census, Pazhugal had a population of 17,302. Males constitute 49% of the population and females 51%. Pazhugal has an average literacy rate of 77%, higher than the national average of74.04% : male literacy is 79%, and female literacy is 74%. In Pazhugal, 12% of the population is under 6 years of age.

References

Cities and towns in Kanyakumari district